Tarrah Harvey (born December 20, 1989) is a retired Canadian ice dancer who competed with partner Keith Gagnon. They are the 2009 Canadian junior silver medalists 2011/2012 Senior National Team Members and Senior Grand Prix competitors. They began skating together in June 1998.

Programs 
(with Gagnon)

Competitive highlights 
(with Gagnon)

References

External links 

 

1989 births
Canadian female ice dancers
Living people
Sportspeople from Mississauga
Figure skaters from Vancouver
20th-century Canadian women
21st-century Canadian women